Flight 128 may refer to:

TWA Flight 128, crashed on 20 November 1967
Necon Air Flight 128, crashed on 5 September 1999

0128